Zhu Dawei may refer to:

 Zhu Dawei (baseball), pitcher for the Seibu Lions
 Zhu Dawei (historian), a historian of the Six Dynasties era